The 2012 IAAF Hammer Throw Challenge was the third edition of the annual, global series of hammer throw competitions organised by the International Association of Athletics Federations. The winners were Krisztián Pars of Hungary (242.35 metres) and Betty Heidler of Germany (230.49 metres). Both retained their titles from 2011 and for Heidler this was a third straight victory. Both the final scores were records for the challenge.

A total of eight meetings featured on the circuit, with five women's and six men's contests spread across those events. The point scoring format was cumulative – the final standings were decided by the sum of athletes' three best throws on the circuit. Only the best throw by an athlete from each meet was taken into consideration.

Calendar
Roughly contiguous with the IAAF World Challenge circuit, a permit hammer throw event was held at eight of the fourteen meetings of that circuit.  Compared to the previous year, one less meeting featured on the series. The Meeting Grand Prix IAAF de Dakar and Brothers Znamensky Memorial were dropped and the Internationales Stadionfest in Berlin was included.

Final standings

Men
A total of seven men recorded valid marks at three meetings and made the final standings.

Women
A total of seven women recorded valid marks at three meetings and made the final standings.

References

2012
IAAF Hammer Throw Challenge